George Beahm is an American author best known for the Stephen King Companion which he first published in 1989 and has updated in 1995 and 2015. He has published thirty books on pop culture icons and written more literary companions than any other author.

References

External links
 

American writers
Stephen King
Year of birth missing (living people)
Living people